Nitinbhai Ratilalbhai Patel (born 22 June 1956) is an Indian politician from Gujarat. He served as the Deputy Chief Minister of Gujarat from 5 August 2016 to 11 September 2021. He was formerly the Minister for Water Supply, Water Resources (excluding Kalpsar Division), Urban Development and Urban Housing. He was elected to the Gujarat Legislative Assembly from Mehsana in 2012 and 2017.

Early life 
Nitinbhai Patel was born on 22 June 1956 in Visnagar. He studied till the second year of B. Com. and dropped out. Before entering politics, he worked in cotton and oil factories. He is an alumnus of Sarva Vidhyalaya Kelavani Mandal.

Political career
 Parliamentary career: Member, Gujarat Legislative Assembly, 1990–95, 1995–97 and 1998–2002. From Kadi (Vidhan Sabha constituency) 
 Committee member: Government Assurances, Public Undertakings, Estimates, Treasurer, B.J.P., Empower Committee for the implementation of VAT. 
 Minister: Health and Family Welfare, 1995–96, Agriculture, Small and Medium Irrigation Schemes, 1998–99, Small and Medium Irrigation Schemes, Roads and Buildings, 1999–2001, Finance and Revenue, 2001–02, Water Supply, Water Resources (except Kalpsar Section), Urban Development and Urban Housing, 2008-.
 Elected MLA in Gujarat in 2012 and 2017, from Mahesana (Vidhan Sabha constituency)

Other posts 
President, Kadi Nagarpalika, 1988–90, Mehsana District BJP, 1997–98. Member, Executive Committee Sarva Vidhyalaya Kelavani Mandal, Kadi, Executive Committee, Bhagyodaya General Hospital, Kadi, Panjarapole  Sanstha, Kadi, Kadi Nagarpalika. Vice-President, Sanskar Mandal, Kadi, Skum Trust School, Thaltej, Ahmedabad. General Secretary, Kadi Taluka Navnirman Committee, 1974, C.N. Arts and B.D. Commerce College, Kadi, 1976. Director, Kadi Agricultural Produce Market Committee, 1984–88, Mehsana District Cooperative Bank Ltd. for eight years. As a 15-year member of Kadi Nagarpalika, he served as Chairman of various Committees including the Executive Committee of Kadi Nagarpalika.

References

External links

 Gujarat Government
  Nitinbhai Patel Personal Website

Deputy chief ministers of Gujarat
State cabinet ministers of Gujarat
People from Mehsana district
1956 births
Gujarat MLAs 1995–1998
Gujarat MLAs 1998–2002
Gujarat MLAs 1990–1995
Living people
Gujarat MLAs 2012–2017
Bharatiya Janata Party politicians from Gujarat
Gujarat MLAs 2017–2022